Thamnophis proximus, commonly known as the western ribbon snake, is a species of garter snake in the subfamily Natricinae of the family Colubridae. The species is endemic to the western United States, Mexico, and Central America. The species has six recognized subspecies.

Description
T. proximus is a slender snake with a very long tail, approximately one-third of the total length of the body. Dorsally, T. proximus is blackish, brown, or olive with three light-colored stripes. Ventrally, it is greenish-white or yellowish-white. The upper labials are whitish and unmarked, contrasting with the dark top and sides of the head.

Adults measure  in total length (including the tail).

Subspecies
Six subspecies of the western ribbon snake (T. proximus) are recognized as being valid, including the nominate subspecies.
T. p. alpinus  – Chiapas Highlands ribbon snake
T. p. diabolicus  – arid land ribbon snake
T. p. orarius  – Gulf Coast ribbon snake
T. p. proximus  – orangestripe ribbon snake, western ribbon snake
T. p. rubrilineatus  – redstripe ribbon snake
T. p. rutiloris  – Mexican ribbon snake

Nota bene: A trinomial authority in parentheses indicates that the subspecies was originally described in a genus other than Thamnophis.

References

External links

Thamnophis proximus, Illinois Natural History Survey
Discover Life - Colubridae: Thamnophis proximus
Encyclopedia of Life - Thamnophis proximus
ITIS - Thamnophis proximus
Western Ribbon Snake, Reptiles and Amphibians of Iowa.

Further reading
Behler JL, King FW (1979). The Audubon Society Field Guide to North American Reptiles and Amphibians. New York: Alfred A. Knopf. 743 pp. . (Thamnophis proximus, pp. 670–671 + Plates 531, 544).
Conant R (1975). A Field Guide to Reptiles and Amphibians of Eastern and Central North America, Second Edition. (Illustrated by Isabelle Hunt Conant). Boston: Houghton Mifflin Company. xviii + 429 pp. + Plates 1-48.  (hardcover),  (paperback). (Thamnophis proximus, pp. 165–166 + Plate 23 + Map 120).
Conant R, Bridges W (1939). What Snake Is That? A Field Guide to the Snakes of the United States East of the Rocky Mountains. (With 108 drawings by Edmond Malnate). New York and London: D. Appleton-Century Company. Frontispiece map + viii +163 pp. + Plates A-C, 1-32. (Thamnophis sauritus proximus, pp. 122–123 + Plate 23, figure 69A).
Powell R, Conant R, Collins JT (2016). Peterson Field Guide to Reptiles and Amphibians of Eastern and Central North America, Fourth Edition. Boston and New York: Houghton Mifflin Harcourt. xiv + 494 pp., 47 Plates, 207 Figures. . (Thamnophis proximus, pp. 428–429 + Plate 42).
Rossman DA (1963). "The Colubrid Snake Genus Thamnophis: A Revision of the sauritus Group". Bulletin of the Florida State Museum 7 (3): 99–178.
Say T (1823). In: James E (1823). Account of an Expedition from Pittsburgh to the Rocky Mountains, Performed in the Years 1819 and '20, by Order of the Hon. J.C. Calhoun, Sec'y of War: Under the Command of Major Stephen H. Long. From the Notes of Major Long, Mr. T. Say, and other Gentlemen of the Exploring Party. Vol. I. Philadelphia: H.C. Carey and I. Lea. 503 pp. (Coluber proximus, new species, p. 187).
Smith HM, Brodie ED Jr (1982). Reptiles of North America: A Guide to Field Identification. New York: Golden Press. 240 pp.  (paperback),  (hardcover). (Thamnophis proximus, pp. 146–147).

proximus
Extant Cenozoic first appearances
Reptiles of Belize
Reptiles of Costa Rica
Reptiles of El Salvador
Reptiles of Guatemala
Reptiles of Honduras
Reptiles of Mexico
Reptiles of Nicaragua
Reptiles of the United States
Reptiles described in 1823
Taxa named by Thomas Say